The 2022 Firestone Grand Prix of St. Petersburg was an IndyCar motor race held on February 27, 2022 at the Streets of St. Petersburg in St. Petersburg, Florida. It was the season opener of the 2022 IndyCar Series.  The race lasted for 100 laps.

Scott McLaughlin of Team Penske scored his first pole in qualifying and claimed his first race victory in the series over Álex Palou, after leading the most laps in the race. Will Power, McLaughlin's teammate, finished third to complete the podium.

Background 
In September 2021, it was announced that St. Petersburg, Florida would host the first race of the 2022 season on February 27, 2022. This marked the first February start for the IndyCar series since the 2004 season and the earliest the season has started since 2003 (at the same circuit). 

Colton Herta was the defending race winner, having won the previous Firestone Grand Prix of St. Petersburg in 2021.

Entrants 
26 drivers entered the race, with six of them classified as rookies for the 2022 season. Four rookies made their IndyCar race debut, two of them for A. J. Foyt Enterprises: Kyle Kirkwood made his debut with the team after winning the 2021 Indy Lights championship, alongside former Super Formula and WEC driver Tatiana Calderón, who secured her seat after impressing the team after a test with the team in 2021. 2021 Indy Lights runner-up David Malukas debuted for Dale Coyne Racing, while Canadian driver Devlin DeFrancesco, who had finished sixth in the 2021 Indy Lights championship, debuted for Andretti Steinbrenner Autosport.

Practice

Practice 1

Practice 2

Qualifying

Qualifying classification 

 Notes
 Bold text indicates fastest time set in session.

Warmup

Race 
The race started at 12:00 PM ET on February 27, 2022.

Race classification

Championship standings after the race 

Drivers' Championship standings

Engine manufacturer standings

 Note: Only the top five positions are included.

References

External links 

Grand Prix of St. Petersburg
Firestone Grand Prix of St. Petersburg
Firestone Grand Prix of St. Petersburg
21st century in St. Petersburg, Florida
Firestone Grand Prix of St. Petersburg